This is a list of old Macintosh software that no longer runs on current Macs. The software might require Mac OS 9 or other versions of the classic Mac OS that doesn't run on Apple's current Macs. Note that most old programs can still be run using emulators, such as SheepShaver, vMac, or Basilisk II.

For a list of current programs, see List of Mac software. Third-party databases include VersionTracker,  MacUpdate and iUseThis. Since a list like this might grow too big and become unmanageable, this list is confined to those programs for which a Wikipedia article exists.

== Children’s and Educational Software ==
Cosmic Osmo and the Worlds Beyond the Mackerel
Creative Writer
Fine Artist
Kid Pix
Living Books

Databases
dbase
FoxPro
Omnis
Panorama

Developer Tools and IDEs
 Apple Media Tool
 AppWare
 Aztec C
 CodeWarrior
 HyperCard – Classic-only IDE
 MacApp
 Macintosh Programmer's Workshop
 Microsoft BASIC
 MTropolis
 Oracle Media Objects
 THINK C
 VideoWorks
 World Builder – game creation system

Games

Graphics, Layout, and Desktop Publishing
 CorelDRAW
 CricketDraw
 CricketPaint
 Digital Darkroom
 Freehand
 FullPaint
 FullWrite Professional
 Gryphon Software Morph
 Illustrator
 LightningPaint
 MacDraw
 MacPaint
 MacPerspective
 MacRenderman
Macromind Director
 PageMaker
 Photoshop
 PixelPaint
 QuarkXPress
 Ready, Set, Go!
 Showplace
 Strata 3D
 SuperPaint
 Typestry

Networking and Telecommunications
 4-Sight Fax
 AppleLink
 eWorld
 FreePPP
 Hotline Connect
 MacTerminal
 Red Ryder
 Wiretap Pro
 ZTerm

Office and Productivity
 AppleWorks – originally ClarisWorks
 Claris Resolve
 CricketGraph
 FullWrite Professional
 Informix Wingz
 Lotus 123
 Lotus Jazz
 MacProject
 MacWrite
 Microsoft Project
 Microsoft Works 
 MindWrite
 Multiplan
 Noteshare
 OpenDoc
 StatView
 Taste (software)
 WordPerfect for Macintosh
 WriteNow

Operating systems

A/UX
Classic Mac OS
System 1
System 6
System 7
Mac OS 8
Mac OS 9
MkLinux

Outliners
 Acta (software)
 MORE (application)

Screen savers
 After Dark

Utilities
 Disinfectant – Antivirus
 DragThing
 Extensis Suitcase
 Fastback
 MultiFinder

Compression
 Compact Pro
 DiskDoubler
 PackIt
 Stuffit

Web browsers
 Cyberdog
 Internet Explorer
 MacLynx
 MacWeb
 MacWWW
 NCSA Mosaic
 Netscape Communicator
 Netscape Navigator

See also 
 List of Mac software

Old Macintosh software|*
Macintosh software|*